Ahmed Jassim Al-Maqabi (born 26 October 1994) is a Bahraini handball player for Barbar Club and the Bahraini national team.

He participated at the 2017 World Men's Handball Championship.

References

External links
 
 
 

1994 births
Living people
Bahraini male handball players
Olympic handball players of Bahrain
Handball players at the 2020 Summer Olympics